Deborah Louz (born 6 February 1980 in Leidschendam, Netherlands) is a Dutch taekwondo practitioner who won a bronze medal in the 57 kg weight class at the 2010 European Taekwondo Championships.

References

Dutch female taekwondo practitioners
People from Leidschendam
Dutch sportspeople of Surinamese descent
1980 births
Living people
European Taekwondo Championships medalists
Sportspeople from South Holland